Hervé Deniel (14 February 1899 – 11 December 1951) was a French wrestler. He competed in the men's freestyle middleweight at the 1928 Summer Olympics.

References

External links
 

1899 births
1951 deaths
French male sport wrestlers
Olympic wrestlers of France
Wrestlers at the 1928 Summer Olympics
Place of birth missing